Mundus subterraneus, quo universae denique naturae divitiae (very roughly "The subterranean world, all its riches") is a scientific textbook written by Athanasius Kircher, and published in 1665. The work depicts Earth's geography through textual description, as well as lavish illustrations. 

Diatribe de Progidiosis Crucibus ("Diatribe of Prodigious Crosses") is Kircher's most succinct and explicit statement in favour of seeking rational causes for phenomena through an understanding of natural laws, derived from observation, rather than seeking miraculous explanations. He pursued this in greater detail in Mundus Subterraneus (1665).

References

External links
 
 

1665 in science
1665 books
Athanasius Kircher
Geography textbooks